B. de Canals was a 14th-century Spanish author of a Latin chronicle.  The initial B. may possibly stand for Bernat.

Literature

Spanish chroniclers
14th-century Spanish  historians